"Buddy Holly" is a song by American rock band Weezer. The song was written by Rivers Cuomo and released as the second single from the band's debut album, Weezer (The Blue Album) on September 7, 1994, which would have been Buddy Holly's 58th birthday. The lyrics reference the song's 1950s namesake and actress Mary Tyler Moore. It reached number two and number 34 on the US Modern Rock Tracks chart and the US Mainstream Rock Tracks chart, respectively. The song also reached number six in Canada, number 12 in the United Kingdom, number 13 in Iceland and number 14 in Sweden.

Rolling Stone ranked "Buddy Holly" number 484 in its list of "The 500 Greatest Songs of All Time" (2021), raising it 15 spots from number 499 (2010), and raised from around 19 years prior, being ranked number 497 (2004). The digital version of the single for "Buddy Holly" was certified gold by the RIAA in 2006. VH1 ranked it as one of the "100 Greatest Songs of the 90s" at number 59 in December 2007.

Writing
Songwriter Rivers Cuomo wrote "Buddy Holly" after his friends made fun of his Asian girlfriend. He originally planned to exclude it from the album; he felt it was "cheesy" and perhaps did not represent the sound he was pursuing for Weezer. Producer Ric Ocasek persuaded him to include it. In the book River's Edge, Ocasek is quoted saying: "I remember at one point he was hesitant to do 'Buddy Holly' and I was like, 'Rivers, we can talk about it. Do it anyway, and if you don't like it when it's done, we won't use it. But I think you should try. You did write it and it is a great song. Bassist Matt Sharp recalled: "Ric said we'd be stupid to leave it off the album.  We'd come into the studio in the morning and find little pieces of paper with doodles on them: WE WANT BUDDY HOLLY."

An early demo of "Buddy Holly" recorded by Cuomo in 1993 has a different feel, as the song is played at a much slower tempo than the version that appears on the album. This version appeared on Alone: The Home Recordings of Rivers Cuomo. The liner notes for Alone explain that the chorus, in its most primitive form, originally was sung as: "Oo-wee-oo you look just like Ginger Rogers / Oh, oh, I move just like Fred Astaire". The rest of the chorus stayed the same as the Blue Album version.

Critical reception

Steve Baltin from Cash Box commented, "You’ve gotta love a song that makes reference to Mary Tyler Moore. Slightly poppier in its guitar sound than their first single, [...], this Ric Ocasek-produced song could help expand their already-growing fan base. Besides that, it mentions Mary, the woman who could turn the world on with her smile. Therefore, it has to be a hit." Pan-European magazine Music & Media wrote, "Made loud to play loud and sing along, it's the ideal power pop to cruise round this summer. That silly twin synth/guitar, betrays producer Ocasek, the one-time driver of New York's Cars." A reviewer from Music Week gave the song four out of five, adding, "A short and sweet taster from the album which may not have the same quirky appeal of "Undone (The Sweater Song)", but has an attractive hook and a video to arouse interest." Paul Evans from Rolling Stone noted "the self-deprecating humor" of lines like "I look like Buddy Holly/You're Mary Tyler Moore".

Music video

According to Matt Sharp, Spike Jonze came up with three ideas for the accompanying music video for "Buddy Holly". Sharp stated that two of the ideas "weren't great". When Jonze pitched the idea that came to be the song's video, Sharp told Jonze "I don't think you'll be able to pull it off", but the band agreed to do it. The video was filmed at Charlie Chaplin Studios in Hollywood over a single day and portrays Weezer performing at Arnold's Drive-In from the 1970s television show Happy Days, combining footage of the band with clips from the show. Happy Days cast member Al Molinaro made a cameo; he introduces the band by saying, "Kenosha, Wisconsin's own Weezer"; in fact it's Molinaro himself who was from Kenosha, while Weezer is from Los Angeles. 

In the climax, the video's stylist Casey Storm body doubled, and this allowed Fonzie to dance to the band's performance. The video also features brief cameos by some members of the band as dancers at Arnold's. Anson Williams, who played Potsie on Happy Days, objected to footage of him appearing in the video, but relented after receiving a letter from David Geffen, founder of Geffen Records. According to drummer Pat Wilson, the video was achieved without computer graphics, only "clever" camerawork and editing. Sharp stated that the video was "pretty fucking wacky".

The video was met with great popularity, and heavy rotation on MTV. At the 1995 MTV Video Music Awards, it won Best Alternative Video, Breakthrough Video, Best Direction and Best Editing, and was nominated for Video of the Year.

The "Buddy Holly" video was included on the Windows 95 installation CD-ROM, resulting in a skyrocket in popularity and earning Weezer a place in the history of MTV Music Video Awards. Geffen did not tell Weezer they had negotiated with Microsoft to include the video; the band members, none of whom owned computers, were oblivious to the implications. According to Wilson, "I was furious because at the time I was like, 'How are they allowed to do this without permission?' Turns out it was one of the greatest things that could have happened to us. Can you imagine that happening today? It's like, there's one video on YouTube, and it's your video."

The video also appears in the music exhibit in the Museum of Modern Art. The music video was featured in Season 5, Episode 30 of MTV's Beavis and Butthead entitled "Here Comes the Bride's Butt" on June 9, 1995.

Track listings

 7": Geffen Records / GFS 88 (UK)
A. "Buddy Holly (LP Version)" – 2:40
B. "Jamie (Geffen Rarities LP Version) " – 4:18

 Cassette single: Geffen Records / GFSC 88 (UK)
A1. "Buddy Holly (LP Version)" – 2:40
A2. "Jamie (Geffen Rarities LP Version) " – 4:18
B1. "Buddy Holly (LP Version)" – 2:40
B2. "Jamie (Geffen Rarities LP Version) " – 4:18

 CD: Geffen Records / GFSTD 88 (UK)
 "Buddy Holly (LP Version)" – 2:40
 "My Name Is Jonas" (Live Version) – 3:40
 "Surf Wax America" (Live Version) – 4:09
 "Jamie (Geffen Rarities LP Version)" – 4:18

 CD: Geffen Records / GED 21978 (Europe)
 "Buddy Holly (LP Version)" – 2:40
 "My Name Is Jonas" (Live Version) – 3:40
 "Surf Wax America" (Live Version) – 4:09

 CD: Geffen Records / GED 22052 (Netherlands)
 "Buddy Holly (LP Version)" – 2:40
 "Surf Wax America" (Live Version) – 4:09

 CD: Geffen Records / GEFDS 21968 (Australia)
 "Buddy Holly (LP Version)" – 2:40
 "Holiday" – 3:26

 CD Promo: Geffen Records / PRO CD 4687 (US)
 "Buddy Holly" – 2:40
Note: Live tracks recorded at Horizontal Boogie Bar, Rochester, New York on November 27, 1994.

Personnel
Rivers Cuomo – lead guitar, rhythm guitar, lead vocals, keyboards
Brian Bell –  backing vocals
Matt Sharp – bass guitar, backing vocals
Patrick Wilson – drums

Charts and certifications

Weekly charts

Year-end charts

Certifications

In popular culture

In 2015, the song was featured as an impromptu a cappella family sing along in an advert for the Honda Pilot. The song was featured on the show Parks and Recreation during the Season 6 episode "Prom".

In 2016, the song was covered by Canadian nerd rock trio Double Experience with an accompanying video

In 2017, the song was chosen by Finn Wolfhard on the show Lip Sync Battle during the Stranger Things episode.

References

External links
 Weezer's Website

Songs about Buddy Holly
Weezer songs
DGC Records singles
Happy Days
Microsoft Windows sample music
MTV Video Music Award for Best Direction
Music videos directed by Spike Jonze
Songs about musicians
Song recordings produced by Ric Ocasek
Songs written by Rivers Cuomo
1994 songs
1995 singles